The Thunder Bay Expressway, originally known as the Lakehead Expressway is a high-capacity at-grade suburban limited-access road around the western side of Thunder Bay in the Canadian province of Ontario. The  route travels in a generally north–south direction on the city's west side. It is signed as part of Highway 61 at its southern end, and as part of the concurrent route of Highway 11 and Highway 17. The expressway features several at-grade intersections between its southern terminus at Arthur Street West and the Harbour Expressway and its northeastern terminus at Hodder Avenue.

The Thunder Bay Expressway was built throughout the mid-to-late 1960s, and opened in stages between mid-1967 and late 1970. The old routes of Highway11/17 and Highway61 through Thunder Bay were redesignated as Highway 11B/17B and Highway 61B. Work is now ongoing to twin Highway11/17 northeast to Nipigon.

Route description 
The Thunder Bay Expressway forms the southernmost portion of the Terry Fox Courage Highway, which continues east to Nipigon along the Trans-Canada Highway.
Between Arthur Street and the Harbour Expressway, the route is designated as part of Highway61, while between there and the northeastern terminus at Hodder Avenue it is designated as part of Highway11 and Highway17, and as a portion of the Trans-Canada Highway.
The entire route is four lanes and undivided, with an exception between Balsam Street and Hodder Avenue where the opposing lanes are separated by a grass median.
Aside from Hodder Avenue, it features signalised at-grade intersections at the six other crossroads along its length.

The Thunder Bay Expressway begins in the south at Arthur Street West, which was once the route of Highway11 and Highway17 west from Thunder Bay prior to 2008. To the south, Highway61 continues towards the American border. Travelling north, the Thunder Bay Expressway is designated as the northernmost segment of Highway61. Featuring a  right-of-way sandwiched between residential subdivisions, the four lane undivided road crosses over the Neebing River. It curves to the northeast, with a large swamp to the west and subdivisions to the east. The expressway reaches a signalised intersection with Highways11 and 17, which continue west along the Shabaqua Highway; the Highway61 designation ends at this intersection, and Highways11 and 17 turn northward along the expressway.

Continuing north, the Thunder Bay Expressway travels through an undeveloped area of the city. It encounters an intersection with Oliver Road before becoming surrounded by forests. It curves northeast over a branch of the McIntyre River at McIntyre Falls, then follows parallel to and north of Golf Links Road. The route becomes sandwiched between residential subdivisions again as it approaches an intersection with John Street. It continues, intersecting the eastern terminus of Highway 102, before crossing McVicar Creek. The route intersects Balsam Street before leaving urban Thunder Bay and entering into forests, at which point the opposing lanes become separated by a grass median. After travelling parallel to the Current River for a short distance, the Thunder Bay Expressway crosses the river and curves east to encounter its only interchange, with Hodder Avenue. From there, the divided freeway continues east towards Nipigon.

History 
In 1963, Charles MacNaughton, minister of the Department of Highways, announced plans for the Lakehead Expressway to be built on the western edge of the twin cities of Port Arthur and Fort William (which amalgamated in 1970 to form Thunder Bay).
Work began in August 1965, with a contract for a  section of divided highway on the west side of the twin cities.
The first section of the expressway opened on August 29, 1967, connecting Oliver Road (then part of Highway 130) and Golf Links Road with Dawson Road (Highway 102).
By mid- to late 1969, the route had been extended to Highway 527 northeast of the twin cities and to Highway 11 and Highway 17 (Arthur Street) at the site of the future Harbour Expressway.
By late 1970, the route had been extended southward from Arthur Street to Neebing Avenue / Walsh Street West. At this time, Highway 11/17 and Highway 61 were rerouted along the completed expressway. The old routes through Thunder Bay were redesignated as Highway 11B/17B and Highway 61B.
However, these routes were decommissioned in 1998.

In 2003 plans were announced for the Shabaqua extension, a  bypass of Highways11 and 17 to the north of the existing route along Arthur Street West.
The new bypass was opened on August17, 2007; as a result, the southernmost  of the Thunder Bay Expressway became part of Highway61.

Future 
The Thunder Bay Expressway was built originally with the intention to widen it into a full freeway with grade-separated interchanges throughout its length. Studies into building these interchanges began in the 1990s before being abandoned. In 2013, studies resumed,
however no design or funding has been announced as of 2022.

Major intersections

References 

Roads in Thunder Bay
Urban segments of the Trans-Canada Highway
Ring roads in Canada